NECC is a four-letter abbreviation which may refer to:

 Navy Expeditionary Combat Command
 Net-Enabled Command Capability
 National Educational Computing Conference
 National Egg Coordination Committee
 National Emergency Call Center
 National Esports Collegiate Conferences
 New England Center for Children
 Northern Essex Community College
 New England clam chowder
 New England Collegiate Conference
 New England Compounding Center
 North Equatorial Countercurrent

See also 

New England Confectionery Company, original name of Necco